Kevin T. Pitts (born 1965) is an American high energy particle physicist. In addition to his faculty appointment at  the :University of Illinois at Urbana–Champaign, in 2021 he was appointed chief research officer at Fermilab National Accelerator Laboratory. His research interests have included the CDF experiment and the Muon g-2 experiment at Fermilab.

Early life and education 
Kevin Todd Pitts, born in Indiana in 1965, is the son of William and Beverley Pitts. He earned a B.A. in physics and mathematics at Anderson University and M.S. and Ph.D. degrees in physics from the University of Oregon. He completed his dissertation in 1994.

Career 
Pitts began his research in high-energy physics at Fermilab in 1994. At the Fermilab Tevatron he investigated heavy-flavor physics and participated in the CDF experiment Higgs boson searches. Pitts is a member of the Muon g-2 experiment at Fermilab.

He joined the faculty at the University of Illinois in 1999, becoming Associate Head for Undergraduate Programs in 2010. In 2014 he became Associate Dean for Undergraduate Programs in the College of Engineering. Pitts is Vice Provost for Undergraduate Education.

As Vice Provost, he has been the architect of the "Illinois Commitment" program to offer free tuition and fees to "talented low- to moderate-income students and those who are the first generation to go to college". He was also the principal investigator on a grant to increase access to science and engineering for low income students, an effort supported by Amazon. Pitts served in the chair line for the National Conference for Undergraduate Women in Physics (CUWiP). He also founded "ICANEXSEL", a University of Illinois College of Engineering program to engage inner-city Chicago middle and high school students in STEM. In addition, Pitts serves on the Board of Directors for the nonprofit Chicago Pre-college Science and Engineering Program.

In March 2021, Pitts became chief research officer at Fermilab National Accelerator Laboratory. His responsibilities there include oversight of the international Deep Underground Neutrino Experiment. He participated in the top quark discovery in 1995, and served on the Long Baseline Neutrino Committee. 

Pitts also serves on the Particle Physics Project Prioritization Panel.

Selected publications

Selected awards, honors 

 American Association for the Advancement of Science Fellow, elected 2016.
 American Physical Society Fellow, 2014, "For his leading role in heavy-flavor physics at the Tevatron collider, including the first evidence of CP violation in bottom mesons, and for significant contributions to triggering at the Collider."
 Arnold O. Nordsieck Award for Excellence in Teaching, 2014, "For his creation and inspirational teaching of innovative courses that introduce undergraduates to the philosophy, fidelity, and elegance of science."

 University of Illinois, University Scholar, 2013. "The University Scholars Program recognizes outstanding members of the faculty and provides each with a funding allocation to enhance their scholarly activities."

 National Science Foundation CAREER Award, 2004.
 United States Department of Energy Outstanding Junior Investigator Award, 2002. "A Stereo Tracking System for the CDF Detector."

References

External links 

 
  (1:08 hours)
 (video, 2:31 minutes)
 (video 46:31 minutes)
A Tiny Particle’s Wobble Could Upend the Known Laws of Physics, By Dennis Overbye, The New York Times.
Muons: 'Strong' evidence found for a new force of nature, By Pallab Ghosh, BBC News.

1965 births
21st-century American physicists
Educators from Indiana
Fellows of the American Association for the Advancement of Science
Fellows of the American Physical Society
Living people
University of Oregon alumni
University of Illinois Urbana-Champaign faculty